Helicobacter rodentium is a bacterium in the Helicobacteraceae family, Campylobacterales order. It is a spiral-shaped bacterium with a bipolar, single, nonsheathed flagellum.  It is resistant to cephalothin and nalidixic acid. Its type strain is MIT 95-1707 (= ATCC 700285). Its name refers to the species first being isolated from mice.

References

Further reading

External links

Campylobacterota
Bacteria described in 1997